Militarnyi (also known as MIL.IN.UA, until 2021 as "Ukrainian Military Portal" (Український мілітарний портал)) is a Ukrainian online media channel on military issues, operating since 2009. The main part of the content is news about Ukrainian and world power structures, military operations and military industry.

In 2017, the NGO "Ukrainian Military Centre" was established.

External links
 Home page (in English, Ukrainian, and Polish)

Ukrainian websites